Guizhou FC was a professional Chinese football club. The team was based in Guiyang, Guizhou and their home stadium was the 51,636 seater Guiyang Olympic Sports Center. Their majority shareholders were Hengfeng Real Estate, Guizhou Zhicheng Enterprise Group Investment Co., Ltd. and the Guizhou Provincial Sports Bureau.

History
On 18 February 2005 the Guizhou Provincial Sports Bureau and Guizhou Zhicheng Enterprise Group Investment Co., Ltd. took over and re-established the Guizhou Province football team as a youth team after paying the membership fee of 600,000 Yuan to the Chinese Football Association. After playing within the youth leagues for several seasons the club decided the team's players were old enough to enter the senior football league. They entered in the third tier at the beginning of the 2008 league season where they came fourth within the Southern league and entered the play-offs where they were knocked out in the quarter-finals. They would achieve the same feat the following season but this time go one better by being knocked out in the second round of the play-offs.

In the 2010 league season the team finished third within the league and missed out on promotion, however despite this the owners decided to take over second tier football club Shanghai Zobon's registration for 5 million Yuan and their place within the division. At the beginning of the season Wang Haifang was brought in to manage the team and initial results under his reign saw the club briefly push for promotion until on 3 June 2011 he died in a car accident. Zhang Ning was brought in as his replacement, however results plummeted and Yuan Yi came in but he was unable to stop the club from relegation after they lost a relegation play-off to Fujian Smart Hero. In the following season the club was immediately able to bounce back and went on to win the 2012 China League Two division. Yuan Yi would decide to leave as manager of the club and on 28 May 2013 Arie Schans from the Netherlands would become the club's first foreign coach. His introduction could not amend the club's disappointing start to the season and the team would go through a 14-game winless streak within the league, which ultimately contributed to their relegation.

In the 2014 league season, Zhang Jun was brought in as the club's Head coach where he led the club to a third-place finish and just outside promotion, however second tier club Shenyang Zhongze F.C. officially dissolved on 27 February 2015, unexpectedly freeing a space within the league, which Guizhou took. Chen Mao was brought in as Head Coach for the start of the 2015 league season and was able to keep the team within the division for the first time within the club's history. This saw Hengfeng Real Estate (in short ) interested in becoming a majority owner of the club, which they completed on January 8, 2016. A new club badge would be introduced to reflect the name change to Guizhou Hengfeng Zhicheng F.C. and the club's home colours were changed from green to white. In the 2016 China League One, the team, which had never ranked above 13th before, went all the way to rank second, earning the most surprising promotion to the Chinese Super League in years, making up for the departure of Beijing Renhe from Guizhou to Beijing that same year.

In December 2017, the club changed their name to Guizhou Hengfeng F.C. They finished eighth in the 2017 Super League in their first season, in what was considered a surprisingly good finish. In 2018, they finished last in the Super League, causing them to be demoted to the 2019 China League One two years after promotion to the top league. In the 2019 China League One they were two points short of second place and promotion back to the Super League after one year.

Guizhou was dissolved after the 2021 season.

Name history
 1992–2015 Guizhou Zhicheng F.C. 贵州智诚
 2016–2017 Guizhou Hengfeng Zhicheng F.C. 贵州恒丰智诚
 2018–2020 Guizhou Hengfeng F.C. 贵州恒丰
 2021 Guizhou F.C. 贵州队

Coaching staff

Managerial history

  Wang Fang (2008)
  Wang Haifang (2011–3 June 2011)
  Zhang Ning (3 June 2011 – 2011)
  Yuan Yi (2011–27 May 2013)
  Arie Schans (28 May 2013– 2014)
  Zhang Jun (2014–31 December 2014)
  Chen Mao (29 January 2015 – 7 April 2016)
  Li Bing (caretaker) (7 April 2016 – 4 May 2017)
  Gregorio Manzano (4 May 2017 – 7 June 2018)
  Dan Petrescu (7 June 2018 – 23 March 2019)
  Hao Haitao (9 April 2019 – 19 June 2019)
  Chen Mao (19 June 2019 – 26 November 2019)
  Wang Xinxin (26 November 2019 – 13 October 2020)
  Chen Mao (13 October 2020 – 27 November 2021)
  Yuan Yi (27 November 2021 – 31 December 2021)

Honours
 China League Two (Third Tier League)
Winners (1) : 2012

Results
All-time League Rankings

As of the end of 2019 season.

 In group stage.

Key
 Pld = Played
 W = Games won
 D = Games drawn
 L = Games lost
 F = Goals for
 A = Goals against
 Pts = Points
 Pos = Final position

 DNQ = Did not qualify
 DNE = Did not enter
 NH = Not Held
- = Does Not Exist
 R1 = Round 1
 R2 = Round 2
 R3 = Round 3
 R4 = Round 4

 F = Final
 SF = Semi-finals
 QF = Quarter-finals
 R16 = Round of 16
 Group = Group stage
 GS2 = Second Group stage
 QR1 = First Qualifying Round
 QR2 = Second Qualifying Round
 QR3 = Third Qualifying Round

Notable players
These players had international caps for their respective countries.

Africa 
Cameroon
 Yves Ekwalla Hermann (2015-2016)
Egypt
 Ali Ghazal (2017) 
Ivory Coast
 Kevin Boli (2018-2020) 
Gambia
 Bubacarr Trawally (2018)
Kenya
 Michael Olunga (2017-2018)
Asia
Australia
 Ryan McGowan (2017)
Hong Kong
 Festus Baise (2016–2019)
 Au Yeung Yiu Chung (2016–2018)
Central & North America
Canada
 Mason Trafford (2013)
Honduras
 Carlo Costly (2013)
Europe

Albania

 Jahmir Hyka  (2020-)
Bosnia and Herzegovina
 Ivan Božić (2013)
Croatia
 Nikica Jelavić (2018-2020)
 Anton Maglica (2019-)
Netherlands
 Tjaronn Chery (2017-2019)
Serbia
 Dragan Stančić (2011)
 Stefan Mihajlović (2020-2021)
Spain
 Mario Suárez (2017-2018)
 Ibán Cuadrado (2015-2016)
South America 
Brazil
 Sérgio Mota (2019-2021)
 Mazola (2016-2017)

References

External links
 

 
Defunct football clubs in China
Association football clubs established in 1992
Association football clubs disestablished in 2022
1992 establishments in China
2022 disestablishments in China
Sport in Guizhou